Governors of Arab Egypt (640–1250) and Mamluk Egypt (1250–1517).  For other periods, see the list of rulers of Egypt.

Rashidun Caliphate (640–658)

Umayyad Caliphate (659–750)

Dates taken from John Stewart's African States and Rulers (2005).

Abbasid Caliphate (750–969)

Governors during the first Abbasid period (750–868)
Dates taken from John Stewart's African States and Rulers (2005).

Autonomous emirs of the Tulunid dynasty (868–905)

Dates taken from John Stewart's African States and Rulers (2005).

Governors during the second Abbasid period (905–935)
Dates taken from John Stewart's African States and Rulers (2005).

Autonomous emirs of the Ikhshidid dynasty (935–969)

Dates taken from John Stewart's African States and Rulers (2005).

Fatimid Dynasty (969–1171)

Dates for Caliphs taken from John Stewart's African States and Rulers (2005).

Ayyubid Sultanate (1171–1252)

Dates taken from John Stewart's African States and Rulers (2005).

Mamluk Sultanate (1250–1517)

Bahri Mamluks (1250–1382, 1389-1390)
Dates taken from John Stewart's African States and Rulers (2005), unless otherwise stated.

Burji Mamluks (1382-1389, 1390–1517)

Sources
Bosworth, Clifford E., The New Islamic Dynasties:  A Chronological and Genealogical Manual, Columbia University Press, New York, 1996 (Google Books)

See also
History of Muslim Egypt

Notes

References

Heads of state of Egypt
Governors
Egypt, Islamic
Islamic Egypt
Egypt
Medieval Islamic world-related lists